Achtung may refer to:

 Achtung, a German word meaning "attention"
 Achtung! – Auto-Diebe!, a crime film from 1930
 Achtung Baby, a 1991 album by U2
 Achtung Bono, a 2005 album by Half Man Half Biscuit
 Achtung, fertig, Charlie!, a 2003 Swiss film
 Achtung Jackass, a 2002 album by The Frustrators
 Achtung – Panzer!, a 1937 book by Heinz Guderian
 Achtung, die Kurve!, also known as Curve Fever, a computer game
 Achtung Spitfire!, a computer game released by Avalon Hill